Fawaz Al-Maghati (born 2 March 1987) is a Saudi Arabian footballer who plays as a left back and midfielder.

External links
 

Living people
1987 births
Saudi Arabian footballers
Association football utility players
Al-Ahli Saudi FC players
Najran SC players
Al-Hazem F.C. players
Al-Qadsiah FC players
Saudi First Division League players
Saudi Professional League players